Federal Highway 70D is the designation for toll highways paralleling Mexican Federal Highway 70.

San Luis Potosí
The  of the highway from Ríoverde to Ciudad Valles, and another  connecting Ciudad Valles to Tamuín while bypassing both cities, form Highway 70D in San Luis Potosí, legally known as Rayón-Entronque Tamuín. The former segment entered service on October 1, 2013; the latter was formally opened on July 6, 2016.

Libramiento Poniente de Tampico
The  is second segment of Highway 70D is located in Tamaulipas. It is also known as the Libramiento Poniente de Tampico (Tampico Western Bypass) or the Maxi Libramiento Tampico. The road is operated by Caminos y Puentes Federales, which charges a toll of 26 pesos per car to travel the full length of Highway 70D.

Autopista Guadalajara-Puerto Vallarta (Red Via Corta a Puerto Vallarta)
The  is the 3rd segment of the Highway 70D it Will serve to bypass Mexican Federal Highway 68D so it can cut time to Puerto Vallarta from 4 hrs to 1 hr 30 min. The total cost of the segment is 134 pesos To ride Completely. From Jala to Compostela the  road is open and fully operational since February 13, 2017. The rest of the Highway from Compostela and Las Vartas to Puerto Vallarta is under construction, this  stretch has no set opening date due to the delays of construction since it does not have the necessary environmental and right-of-way permits issued by the SEMARNAT and the SCT and also, due to lack of resources from the public budget caused by the COVID-19 pandemic.

The Highway is maintained by three different operators. First, the  Jala to Compostela road stretch is Maintained by OCACSA. Second, the under construction and unopened  stretch or road from Compostela to Puerto Vallarta will be maintained by CAPUFE from Compostela to Las Varas. Finally, from Las Varas to Puerto Vallarta it will be maintained by Autopista Las Varas - Puerto Vallarta S.A. de C.V. a subsidiary of Impulsora del Desarrollo Económico de América Latina (IDEAL) owned by Carlos Slim and his company Grupo Carso.

External links
Autopista Valles-Tamuín website
Autopista Jala Compostela website
Proyecto Red Via Corta a Puerto Vallarta

References 

Mexican Federal Highways